Copiapó, also known as Azufre, is a stratovolcano located in the Atacama Region of Chile. The volcano separates the two portions in which Nevado Tres Cruces National Park is divided. In its vicinity lies Ojos del Salado. At its summit an Inca platform can be found.

The Valle Ancho fault can be traced beneath this volcano. The main cone is formed by dacites and block and ash flows that were later intruded by dacitic porphyries, associated with hydrothermal alteration. A smaller centre formed on the northern side of the main cone, as well as thick ignimbrites in two units. A complex of lava domes lies at their southern-eastern end with more hydrothermally altered porphyric intrusions named Azufrera de Copiapo. The last activity 6-7 million years ago formed a shield overlying the lava dome complex and the San Roman dome. Obsidian from this volcanic area has been found in archeological sites.

Some rocks in the upper parts of the volcano may be of Quaternary age. The Global Volcanism Program claims that Copiapó was reported to be fumarolically active by Ferdinand von Wolff 1929 who refers to Rudolph Hauthal; it also gives "Lastarria" and "Azufre" as alternative names for Copiapó. Hauthal does not refer to Copiapó volcano as fumarolically active, but instead refers to Azufre and Lastarria which are volcanoes unrelated to Copiapó.

Climbing 
The summit is probably  based on a Tandem-X study.

The first recorded modern climb was by Stefan Osiecki, Witold Paryski, Jan Szczepanski and Justyn Wojsznis (Poland) October 3, 1937.

Gallery

See also 
 List of volcanoes in Chile
 List of Ultras of South America

References

External links 
 "Cerro Azufre, Chile" on Peakbagger

Volcanoes of Atacama Region
Mountains of Chile
Stratovolcanoes of Chile
Six-thousanders of the Andes
Miocene stratovolcanoes
Pliocene stratovolcanoes